The 2002 elections to Southwark Council were held in the London Borough of Southwark, England, on 2 May 2002.  The whole council was up for election, with boundary changes since the last election in 1998, reducing the number of seats by one. There were 63 seats in 21 wards. The Council moved from Labour controlled to no overall control, with a minority Liberal Democrat executive. Turnout was 26.2%.

Southwark local elections are held every four years, with the next held in 2006.

Election result

|}

Ward Results

Brunswick Park

Camberwell Green

Cathedrals

Chaucer

College

East Dulwich

East Walworth

Faraday

Grange

Graham Nash was previously elected as a Liberal Democrat councillor

Livesey

Newington

Nunhead

Christine Claridge was previously elected as a Labour councillor

Peckham

Peckham Rye

Riverside

Rotherhithe

South Bermondsey

South Camberwell

Surrey Docks

The Lane

Village

By-Elections 2002-06

The by-election was called following the death of Cllr. Margaret Ambrose.

References

Council elections in the London Borough of Southwark
2002 London Borough council elections
21st century in the London Borough of Southwark